David Carter Hardesty Jr. is an American lawyer and educator who was the 21st president of West Virginia University from 1995 to 2007.  As an undergraduate student at West Virginia University, Hardesty was student body president, a member of Phi Kappa Psi, and a Rhodes Scholar.  Hardesty earned J.D. from Harvard Law School in 1973, and a B.A. from Oxford University in 1969 which was redesignated an M.A. in 1983.  He was a partner with Bowles, Rice, McDavid, Graff & Love from 1973 to 1995, and served as the Tax Commissioner of West Virginia from 1977 to 1980.  Hardesty then began his twelve-year tenure as president of WVU.  He is currently president emeritus and professor of law at West Virginia University.

References

External links
Forbes.com
http://wvbarfoundation.org/fellows/
http://wvutoday.wvu.edu/n/2010/1/11/wvu-announces-2010-david-c-hardesty-jr-festival-of-ideas-schedule

Lawyers from Morgantown, West Virginia
Presidents of West Virginia University
West Virginia University alumni
West Virginia University faculty
Harvard Law School alumni
American Rhodes Scholars
Alumni of The Queen's College, Oxford
1946 births
Living people